Bert Niosi (February 10, 1909 – August 3, 1987) was a Canadian bandleader, known as "Canada's King of Swing".

Early life
Niosi was born on February 10, 1909, in London, Ontario. "As a teenager he briefly played clarinet with Guy Lombardo in Cleveland." Niosi had two brothers who also became musicians: Joe and Johnnie.

Later life and career
Niosi was proficient on several instruments: clarinet, flute, saxophone, trombone, and trumpet. He formed a dance band in 1931. This began a long association with the Palais Royale dance hall in Toronto, which lasted until 1950. Here, he earned the nickname 'Canada's King of Swing'. His orchestra, and a smaller group made up of some of its members, was broadcast frequently on CBC Radio. Niosi played alto saxophone and clarinet in the small band. He was also a member of CBC radio's The Happy Gang musical series from 1952 to 1959. He died in Toronto on August 3, 1987.

References

1909 births
1987 deaths
Canadian jazz bandleaders
Musicians from London, Ontario
20th-century Canadian male musicians